There are three different Finnish Player of the Year Awards in Finland. The sports journalists have elected their male "Player of the Year" since 1947, the Football Association of Finland theirs since 1953. In 1976 the FA began selecting a female "Player of the Year".

Finnish Footballer of the Year

Men

Women

See also
 Finnish Sportspersonality of the year
 Finnish Football Manager of the Year

Notes

References
RSSSF (men)
RSSSF (women)

Football in Finland
European football trophies and awards
Association football player of the year awards by nationality
Awards established in 1947
Awards established in 1953
1947 establishments in Finland
1953 establishments in Finland
Annual events in Finland
Finnish awards